

Objects
 Roosevelt Dime
 Franklin Delano Roosevelt Memorial, on the Tidal Basin, Washington, D.C.

Buildings
 Roosevelt Room of the White House, Washington, D.C.
 F.D. Roosevelt Airport
 F.D. Roosevelt Teaching Hospital with Policlinic Banská Bystrica

Military vessels
USS Franklin D. Roosevelt (CV-42), in commission 1945–1977
USS Roosevelt (DDG-80), commissioned in 2000.

Parks
 F. D. Roosevelt State Park in Pine Mountain, Georgia
 Franklin D. Roosevelt State Park in Yorktown, New York
 Franklin D. Roosevelt Four Freedoms Park on Roosevelt Island, New York City, New York
 Franklin Delano Roosevelt Park in South Philadelphia, Pennsylvania
 Parque Franklin Delano Roosevelt in Ciudad de la Costa near Montevideo, Uruguay
 Rooseveltplatz in Vienna, Austria
 Praça Franklin Roosevelt in São Paulo, Brazil

Schools
 Franklin D. Roosevelt High School in Dallas, Texas
 Franklin Delano Roosevelt High School in Brooklyn, New York
 Franklin Delano Roosevelt High School in Hyde Park, New York
 Roosevelt House Public Policy Institute at Hunter College
 Roosevelt University in Chicago, Illinois
 Primaria (Elementary) Franklin D Roosevelt in Matamoros, Tamaulipas, Mexico

Statues

 Franklin D. Roosevelt statue (in sitting position), Avenue Dr. Américo Ricaldoni in Montevideo, Uruguay
 Franklin D. Roosevelt statue (standing), Calz. Mahatma Gandhi in Chapultepec, Mexico City, Mexico
 Franklin D. Roosevelt statue (standing), Grosvenor Square in London, UK
 Franklin D. Roosevelt statue (sitting), Akershusstranda in Oslo, Norway
 Franklin D. Roosevelt statue in Yalta, Crimea
 Franklin D. Roosevelt statue at Dowdell's Knob

Streets, bridges, and subway stations
 South Beach-Franklin Delano Roosevelt Boardwalk, East Shore of Staten Island, New York City, New York
 Franklin Delano Roosevelt Mid-Hudson Bridge, New York
 Franklin Delano Roosevelt Bridge, Maine State Route 189 in the community of Lubec, Maine in the United States with New Brunswick Route 774 on Campobello Island, New Brunswick in Canada
 Franklin D. Roosevelt station in Paris Métro
 Franklin D. Roosevelt East River Drive, Manhattan, New York City, New York
 Franklin Roosevelt Street in Poznań, Poland
 Alameda Franklin Delano Roosevelt, a section of road in San Salvador, El Salvador.
 Franklin D. Roosevelt Memorial Bridge near Pine Mountain, Georgia
 Roosevelt Street in Tehran, Iran – name retired after the 1979 Iranian Revolution
 Roosevelt Road, an avenue named in memory of FDR in Taipei, Taiwan
 Franklin Delano Roosevelt, a road in Ciudad de la Costa near Montevideo, Uruguay
 Franklin Delano Roosevelt, a road in Santa Rosa, Uruguay
 Roosevelt Street, a street in central Belgrade, Serbia
 Roosevelt Street in Brno, Czech Republic
 Roosevelt Street in Prague, Czech Republic
 Roosevelt Street in Košice, Slovakia
 Roosevelt Street in Yalta, Crimea
 Roosevelt Avenue in Quezon City, Metro Manila, Philippines (until January 13, 2022 when it was renamed Fernando Poe Jr. Avenue)
 Roosevelt Station is the northern terminus of Line 1 of the Manila Light Rail Transit System in Metro Manila, Philippines

Topographical features

 Roosevelt Island, New York City, New York
 Franklin D. Roosevelt Lake in Grand Coulee Dam, Washington

Other
Franklin D. Roosevelt Presidential Library and Museum
Roosevelt Institute
The mineral rooseveltite
 Franklin D. Roosevelt VA Medical Center, in Montrose, New York
Memorial stone in front of the National Archives Research Center building, reportedly requested by Roosevelt in conversation with justice Felix Frankfurter in 1941
 Memorial in Westminster Abbey
Roosevelt, New Jersey

See also
Cultural depictions of Franklin D. Roosevelt
Presidential memorials in the United States

References

 
Roosevelt, Franklin D
Franklin D. Roosevelt-related lists